Arkansas Highway 90 (AR 90, Ark. 90, and Hwy. 90) is an east–west state highway in northeast Arkansas. The route of  runs from Main Street in Ravenden to Route 84 at the Missouri state line. The route is an entirely undivided surface highway that passes through rich cotton country.

Route description

AR 90 begins at Main Street in Ravenden and heads north to cross US 62/US 63/US 412. The route winds to Pocahontas where it meets AR 115 and US 62/US 67/AR 166 (Future I-57). US 67/AR 90 run together south to Shannon. AR 90 then turns east to meet AR 231 and AR 34 in O'Kean. The route runs diagonally northeast until meeting AR 135 east of Knobel.

The route runs east to meet AR 141 near Boydsville, Arkansas and US 49/AR 1 in Rector. AR 90 continues west to terminate at Route 84 at the St. Francis River on the Missouri state line.

Major intersections
Mile markers reset at concurrencies.

|-
| colspan=4 align=center |  concurrency west, 
|-
| colspan=4 align=center |  concurrency south, 

|-
| colspan=5 align=center |  concurrency north, 

|-
| colspan=5 align=center |  concurrency east,

See also

Notes

References

External links

Crowley's Ridge Parkway
090
Transportation in Lawrence County, Arkansas
Transportation in Randolph County, Arkansas
Transportation in Greene County, Arkansas
Transportation in Clay County, Arkansas